The Georgian S1 route (Georgian: ს1, also known as Tbilisi-Senaki-Leselidze), is a "road of international importance" with a registered length of  within the Georgian classification system, which makes it the longest Georgian highway route. It runs from Tbilisi via Mtskheta, Gori, Khashuri, Zestaponi, Kutaisi, Samtredia, Senaki, Zugdidi, Sukhumi and Gagra to the border with Russia near Leselidze at the northwestern tip of the country, covering in practice . After crossing the Georgia–Russia border in breakaway Abkhazia, the highway continues to Sochi and Krasnodar as A147. It is part of European E60, E97 and E117 routes and Asian Highways AH5, AH81 and AH82, and connects with six other S-routes.

North of Zugdidi, across the Enguri River which is the disputed Abkhazia–Georgia border, the remaining  of the S1 route through breakaway Abkhazia is not under central Georgian control. Crossing into Abkhazia from Georgian controlled territory (and vice versa) is not possible by car, only by foot via the Enguri Bridge which is part of the S1 route.

While the majority of the S1 highway is a two-lane road, major parts have been rebuilt since 2006 as 2x2 motorway/expressway, specifically Tbilisi to Surami and Zestaponi (Argveta) to Samtredia. The redesign of the trunk section of the S1 between Tbilisi and Samtredia to motorway or expressway standards is part of the East-West Highway project, a major investment into Georgia's international road connectivity. As of 2021 the mountainous  "Rikoti Pass Road" and the remaining  of the Khashuri Bypass are under construction as 2x2 expressway and are expected to be completed by 2023.

Background

In the 1980s the current S1 route was entirely part of the Soviet M27 highway route that ran from Baku via Tbilisi to Novorossiysk. The Russian part of that M27 existed until 2018 when it got renumbered as A147 highway. Prior to the 1980s, the route of the current S1 was composed of the 17 (Tbilisi to Samtredia) and the 19 (Samtredia to Leselidze) highways.

After Georgia regained independence in 1991, the M27 designation was maintained until 1996 when the current route numbering system was adopted.

The S1 has been a two lane highway prior to the inception of the East-West Highway project in 2005, with the exception of Tbilisi city and the subsequent  along Mtskheta to the S3 junction near Natakhtari which have been multilane since earlier years. In the 1980s expansion of the (then M27) highway to four lanes was envisioned and ground works had already started until Igoeti when the Soviet Union collapsed and Georgia became independent. This and the turbulent 1990s in Georgia interrupted these plans, which were picked up again after the 2003 Rose Revolution. Around 2004 the junction with the S3 highway near Natakhtari was upgraded with grade-separation.

East-West Highway

The East-West Highway project includes redesign of major sections of the Georgian S1, S2, S4, S12 and more recently the S7 highway, to grade-separated highways, mostly as 2x2 expressway.

The majority of the East-West Highway has been planned as 2x2 expressway, in some cases the upgrades have been implemented as grade-separated two lane highway with median separation and hard shoulders (reminiscent of a super-two), such as the S2 Kobuleti and Batumi Bypasses. The S1 Kutaisi Bypass was initially constructed as a grade-separated wide two lane highway with hard shoulders, but was doubled to a 2x2 motorway a few years later. While most of the involved sections of the S1 have been completely redesigned and rerouted with bypasses of cities and towns, the  Natakhtari to Gori/Sveneti section follows the original route and has been doubled between 2006 and 2009 by constructing an additional parallel two-lane road (and rehabilitation of the old road before becoming operational as 2x2). The  northern bypass of Gori (Sveneti - Ruisi) was the first real test of the project during 2009-2011, with two new parallel 880 meter viaducts and two parallel tunnels of 800 meter in one project divided over three tenders. The short but fierce 2008 Russo-Georgian War had a temporary effect on the project, and construction quickly picked up in 2009.

Despite earlier political promises the East-West Highway would be finished by 2020, the construction of crucial sections is still ongoing (as of 2021) until at least 2024, with remaining sections of the S1 to be completed by 2023. The project is sponsored by both European and Asian development banks, the World Bank, European Union and others, giving credits amounting to more than $2 billion for the S1 upgrades alone (with additional state funding). Construction companies from various European and Asian countries have been involved, with mixed success. Some tenders ran into technical and legal issues, with some contracts having been terminated by the Georgian government due to excessive underperformance of the contracted party, resulting in multiple year delays on various lots.

For the S1 highway the (E60/E70) East-West Highway project is scoped to the  Tbilisi - Samtredia section. The project envisions to upgrade the S1 to (2x2) expressway/motorway standards until Samtredia, where the S12 will continue as (2x2) motorway in the direction of Batumi. As it stands, the S1 between Samtredia and Senaki will remain a two lane highway with no major redesigns scheduled as of 2021. The focus of the East-West Highway upgrades in the western part lies in the shorter route to Batumi via a completely redesigned S12.

Below a detailed overview of S1 sections that have been or are being upgraded to 2x2 expressway/motorway configuration within the East-West Highway project, in consecutive order from East (Tbilisi) to West.

Route
The Georgian "Law on motor roads" stipulates that the reference point for the mileage of roads leaving Tbilisi is Freedom Square. This means Freedom Square is the reference point of the S1 mileage reflected in the tables below (and the kilometer posts along the road) while not necessarily its actual starting point, which is a bit harder to determine precisely.

Tbilisi — Khashuri

As central city thoroughfare this is a crowded section, with jamming on parts throughout the day. After passing the Saburtalo neighbourhood on the left hand side, the road diverts from the river bank with a wide median and 2x4 lanes. The speed limit is  here. Along the Dighomi neighbourhood the median is used for U-turn points. After passing the Tbilisi Mall at the northern tip of the city and the tight left turn to Mtskheta, the road leaves the city of Tbilisi and becomes a 2x2 expressway/motorway.

The road crosses the Kura river and passes Mtskheta, the capital of the Georgian historic Kingdom of Iberia, and Jvari Monastery, the site of Georgia's 4th century Christian conversion. The highway follows the Aragvi River for a few kilometers and after the junction with the S3 highway to Kazbegi and Russia the road turns West. From this point westward the highway has been gradually upgraded to 2x2 since 2006 within the ambitious and prestigious East-West Highway project with a predominantly concrete road surface. At the rise at Igoeti two viaducts have been constructed in recent years to bypass the village, river and regional roads, after which the highway continues through an agricultural valley with a mountain ridge on the left hand side and the foothills of the South Ossetia/Tskhinvali breakaway region on the right. At Nadarbazevi village the highway runs only a few hundred meters away from the de facto administrative boundary line of the breakaway region.

Reaching the city of Gori the highway crosses the S10 highway which goes to Russia via South Ossetia through the Roki Tunnel. While Tskhinvali, the administrative capital of South Ossetia, is signposted it cannot be reached via the S10. On either side of the twin-tube tunnel large highway service stations have opened in 2011, a premiere for Georgia at the time. After the tunnel the highway navigates down to meet the Kura river again, and follows it in a flat landscape until Khashuri. Various bypass sections have been constructed here in recent years. Near Khashuri the climb to the Likhi Range and the Rikoti Tunnel begins via a new bypass through the hills on the east side of Khashuri.

Khashuri — Samtredia

East of Khashuri town the highway quickly climbs into the Likhi Range to the Rikoti Tunnel via a new bypass. The bypass temporarily ends at Surami where the highway joins the old S1 two lane road until the construction of the 2nd section of the Khashuri Bypass will be finished. Construction has been suspended for a few years due to contractual issues but should resume by 2021 with a new constructor. The old S1 route through Khashuri and Surami is still important for through traffic to the S8 highway for touristic Borjomi and Turkey and Armenia.

The 1984 Roki Tunnel at the end of the S10 highway is longer, but is shared with Russia while the Georgian section is not under control of Georgian authorities as it is located in breakaway South Ossetia region.

From here the highway navigates downhill to Zestaponi following the Rikotula, Dzirula and Kvirila rivers. The Likhi Range separates East and West Georgia and is a geographic connection between the Greater Caucasus range in the north and the Lesser Caucasus range in the south. The 50 km to Zestaponi is a curvy 2 lane highway route through lush and thickly forested river gorges with little opportunity to safely pass slower vehicles while running through villages and settlements. In the eastern (Tbilisi) direction, the road has a  passing lane (2+1) for the uphill climb to the Rikoti Tunnel. Overall the practical speed is limited on this section. A completely new  2x2 expressway/motorway is under construction from the Rikoti Tunnel to Zestaponi/Argveta as part of the East-West Highway project with 96 tunnels and 53 bridges to be completed by 2024. This will reduce travel time significantly on this section.

West of Zestaponi, at Argveta, the S1 continues as a 2x2 motorway/expressway and enters the West-Georgian Colchis Plain by following the Kvirila river to Kutaisi, Georgia's 3rd largest city and home to the nation's second airport (David the Builder) which serves as tourist and low-cost carrier gateway. Near Kutaisi a completely new 41 km long bypass to Samtredia has been built. It first opened as two-lane highway in 2014, and by the end of 2020 as 2x2 motorway. At Samtredia the S1 highway connects with the S12 highway and runs through the town. From here the S1 continues to Senaki as two-lane highway. A new S12 2x2 motorway is under construction which will effectively be a continuation of the S1 motorway section. When completed, the S1 will continue via the Samtredia exit and pass over the current S12 with a viaduct.

Samtredia — Zugdidi / Enguri Bridge
At Samtredia the S1 leaves the 2x2 motorway, transfers through the town via a 1 km overlap with the S12 highway and continues to Senaki as two-lane highway. The road then passes through a string of towns and villages. A few kilometers West of Senaki the S2 highway branches of the S1 highway to the Black Sea port of Poti, which is also the destination of the E60 route. The S1 highway continues its route through the Colchis Plain with a string of villages and settlements and eventually reaches the city of Zugdidi. The highway runs as a straight line into the center of the city, to its Tavisupleba (Freedom) Square. From here the highway runs anti-clockwise around the local Botanical garden, and after crossing the Chkhousi River the road heads straight towards Abkhazia. About a kilometer before the Enguri River bridge, a Georgian police post is effectively the end for most (car) travellers on the S1, as travel into Abkhazia is restricted (by the Abkhazian side) and cars are not allowed to pass through the Abkhaz checkpoint.

Enguri Bridge — Leselidze

On the west side of the Enguri Bridge there is an Abkhaz checkpoint, after which the highway continues to Gali, the center of the Georgian community in Abkhazia. North from Gali the road crosses the discharge channel of the Enguri Dam Hydropower Cascade. From here the road continues in northwestern direction through the lush lowlands of southern Abkhazia, bypasses Ochamchire town and only near Sokhumi the foothills of the Caucasus Mountains push the road closer to the coast. At Tkhubuni village,  from Tbilisi and the southern terminus of the Sokhumi trolleybus, the Black Sea coast is finally reached. The highway then skirts the beaches and enters Sokhumi, the capital and main city of Abkhazia. The entire Abkhazian section of the S1 highway is a simple two lane road.

The route makes its way through the center of Sokhumi, passes the once famous Botanical Garden, Monkey Nursery and Railway station before making its way out to the north, towards the Gumista River. About five kilometers north of the city, the road crosses the Gumista River via a landmark bridge. The 170 meter long bridge with three arches rises high above the river and was built in 1932. It was the site of a fierce Abkhaz offensive towards Sokhumi against the Georgian army during the 1992-1993 civil war, taking the lives of at least 222 Abkhaz combatants. Plans to build a new bridge were unfolded in 2016, but in 2021 it appeared no compatible designs and other construction estimations were produced by the company that was paid in advance.

The highway continues west skirting the foothills of the Caucasus Mountains, and after reaching its highest point in the Abkhazian section descends back to the coast via a couple of hairpin bends. After passing the town of Gudauta, host of a Russian military base, the road turns inland circumventing the Bichvinta-Miuseri Strict Nature Reserve, Pitsunda Bay and the resort town the bay was named after. At Gagra the road goes through a tunneled bypass which was constructed in the 1980s to relieve the resort town growing transit traffic. The bypass consists of two tunnels of 1200 and 800 meters and was originally planned as 4 tunnels. The 3rd tunnel was under construction when the Soviet Union collapsed and construction was aborted. It was cut for 1300 meter from the south end and 300 meter from the north. A fourth tunnel was envisioned as well, but construction never started. The incomplete 3rd tunnel is now a favorite among urbexers. During the Abkhazian-Georgian civil war the bridge between the first and second tunnel was blown up, effectively disabling the bypass. In 2013 the (short) bridge was rebuilt, and both tunnels were rehabilitated and have been reopened for traffic since.

The Georgian S1 route reaches its end after  at the Psou River crossing which is the border with the Russian Federation at Leselidze (Gyachrypsh). Traffic passes through an Abkhazian controlled checkpoint before reaching the Russian border control and the Russian A147 highway across the river.

Intersections

Notes

References

Roads in Georgia (country)